Michael B. Murphy is an Irish doctor and academic. He was the President of University College Cork from 2007 to 2017. Since April 2019, Murphy is president of the European University Association (EUA).

Early life and education
Murphy earned his undergraduate degree in medicine at University College Cork (UCC), graduating in 1973. He undertook further studies at the Royal Postgraduate Medical School in London, England. He then studied for a doctorate at the National University of Ireland, which he completed in 1984.

Career
From 1984 to 1992, Murphy taught medicine and pharmacology at the University of Chicago in the United States. In 1992, he returned to Ireland and UCC, where he had been appointed Professor of Clinical Pharmacology and Therapeutics. He was appointed the dean of the faculty of medicine and health at UCC in 2000, before becoming the head of its college of medicine and health in 2006. In December 2006, he was announced as the next President of University College Cork. He took up the post on 1 February 2007 in succession to Gerry Wrixon. He stepped down as president in 2017, after ten years leading UCC, and was succeeded by Patrick O'Shea.

As a physician, Murphy practised medicine at St Vincent's University Hospital, Dublin and at St Finbarr's Hospital, Cork.

Selected works

References

 

 
 
 

Living people
Academics of University College Cork
Year of birth missing (living people)
Presidents of University College Cork
University of Chicago faculty
20th-century Irish medical doctors
21st-century Irish medical doctors
Alumni of University College Cork